The Culinary Institute of America has approximately 49,000 graduates in the culinary industry. Notable alumni include:

 Nicole Abiouness
 Grant Achatz
 David Adjey
 Stephen Asprinio
 Emel Başdoğan
 Wilo Benet
 Jonathan Benno
 John Besh
 Richard Blais
 Marcy Blum
 Jérôme Bocuse
 Anthony Bourdain
 David Burke
 Anne Burrell
 Andrew Carmellini
 David Carmichael
 Josef Centeno
 Maneet Chauhan
 Richard Chen
 Michael Chiarello
 Roy Choi
 Mike Colameco
 Scott Conant
 Cat Cora
 Dan Coudreaut
 Robert Danhi
 Gary Danko
 Jill Davie
 Marcel Desaulniers
 Harold Dieterle
 Rocco DiSpirito
 John Doherty
 Steve Ells
 Sohla El-Waylly
 Todd English
 Dean Fearing
 Susan Feniger
 Larry Forgione
 Amanda Freitag
 Alex García
 Geoffrey Gatza
 Duff Goldman
 Todd Gray
 Ilan Hall
 Johnny Hernandez
 Rochelle Huppin
 Hung Huynh
 Johnny Iuzzini
 Joseph Johnson
 Melissa Kelly
 Vikas Khanna
 Eli Kulp
 Maciej Kuroń
 Sara La Fountain
 Francis Lam
 Stephen Langlois
 Bruce Lefebvre
 Matthew Levin
 Kelly Liken
 Shane Lyons
 Christina Machamer
 David McInerney
 Thomas McNaughton
 Jehangir Mehta
 Spike Mendelsohn
 George Mendes
 Michael Mina
 Rick Moonen
 Sara Moulton
 Bradley Ogden
 Ken Oringer
 Ralph Pagano
 Charlie Palmer
 Stella Parks
 Rajat Parr
 Melissa Perello
 Tina Pickett
 Ben Pollinger
 Alfred Portale
 Eamon Rockey
 L. Timothy Ryan
 Jeffrey Saad
 Walter Scheib
 Pedro Miguel Schiaffano
 Chris Schlesinger
 Barton Seaver
 Kerry Simon
 Michael Smith
 Greggy Soriano
 Lon Symensma
 Michael Symon
 Dale Talde
 Sue Torres
 Marcel Vigneron
 Jason Vincent
 Paul Virant
 Bryan Voltaggio
 Brendan Walsh
 Chris Waters
 Jasper White
 Laurie Wolf
 Roy Yamaguchi
 Sherry Yard
 Geoffrey Zakarian
 Rob Zerban
 Eric Ziebold

References

Lists of people by university or college in New York (state)